Defining Moments may refer to:
"Defining Moments", a song by Phinehas from the 2021 album The Fire Itself
"Defining Moments", the third episode of the fourth season of Sex and the City
Defining Moments (film), a film starring Burt Reynolds
Defining Moments, a line of Air Jordan shoes produced by Nike